Rhynchopyga flavicollis is a species of moth in the subfamily Arctiinae. It is found in Guatemala.

References

Moths described in 1884
Euchromiina